was the fifth of twenty-four s, built for the Imperial Japanese Navy following World War I. When introduced into service, these ships were the most powerful destroyers in the world. They served as first-line destroyers through the 1930s, and remained formidable weapons systems well into the Pacific War.

History
Construction of the advanced Fubuki-class destroyers was authorized as part of the Imperial Japanese Navy's expansion program from fiscal 1923, intended to give Japan a qualitative edge with the world's most modern ships. The Fubuki class had performance that was a quantum leap over previous destroyer designs, so much so that they were designated . The large size, powerful engines, high speed, large radius of action and unprecedented armament gave these destroyers the firepower similar to many light cruisers in other navies. Murakumo, built at the Fujinagata Shipyards in Osaka was laid down on 25 April 1927, launched on 27 September 1928 and commissioned on 10 May 1929. Originally assigned hull designation “Destroyer No. 39”, she was completed as Murakumo.

Operational history
On completion, Murakumo was assigned to Destroyer Division 12 under the IJN 2nd Fleet. During the Second Sino-Japanese War, Murakumo was assigned to patrols of the central China coast, and participated in the Invasion of French Indochina in 1940.

World War II
At the time of the attack on Pearl Harbor, Murakumo was assigned to Destroyer Division 12 of Desron 3 of the IJN 1st Fleet, and had deployed from Kure Naval District to the port of Samah on Hainan Island. From 4 December to 12 December, she covered Japanese landings at Kota Bharu in Malaya. From 16 December, Murakumo was assigned to cover Japanese landings during Operation B in British Borneo. During this operation, Murakumo engaged the Dutch submarine  with depth charges after the submarine had torpedoed the destroyer . Although Murakumo claimed credit for sinking K XVI, credit was later awarded to the submarine .

In February 1942, Murakumo was part of the escort for the heavy cruiser  during Operation L, the invasion of Banka-Palembang and Anambas Islands. Murakumo joined the Western Java invasion force, and was in the Battle of Sunda Strait on 1 March, assisting in the sinking of the Australian cruiser , the American cruiser  and the  Dutch destroyer . On 10 March, Murakumo was reassigned to Destroyer Division 20 of Desron3 of the IJN 1st Fleet, and subsequently was involved in Operation T (the invasion of northern Sumatra) on 12 March and Operation D, (the invasion of the Andaman Islands) on 23 March. From 13–22 April, Murakumo returned via Singapore and Camranh Bay to Kure Naval Arsenal for maintenance.

On 4–5 June 1942, Murakumo participated in the Battle of Midway as part of Admiral Isoroku Yamamoto’s main fleet.

In July 1942, Murakumo sailed from Amami-Oshima to Mako Guard District, Singapore, Sabang and Mergui for a projected second Indian Ocean raid. The operation was cancelled due to the Guadalcanal campaign, and Murakumo was ordered to Truk instead. From August onwards, Murakumo was used for "Tokyo Express" high-speed transport missions in the Solomon Islands.

On another mission on 11–12 October 1942, as Murakumo was attempting to assist the cruiser  in the aftermath of the Battle of Cape Esperance, she was attacked by Allied aircraft. Three near misses, a torpedo hit and then a bomb hit left the ship unmaneuverable and aflame, with 22 crewmen dead.

On 15 November 1942, Murakumo was removed from the navy list.

Notes

References

External links

 Muir, Dan Order of Battle - The Battle of the Sunda Strait 1942

Fubuki-class destroyers
1928 ships
Second Sino-Japanese War naval ships of Japan
World War II destroyers of Japan
Destroyers sunk by aircraft
Shipwrecks in the Solomon Sea
World War II shipwrecks in the Pacific Ocean
Maritime incidents in October 1942
Ships sunk by US aircraft
Ships built by Fujinagata Shipyards